Leland B. Jacobs (1907–1992) was an American professor emeritus of education who was known particularly for his work in the teaching of literature.

Biography
Jacobs was born in Tawas City, Michigan.  He took his bachelor's degree from Michigan State Normal College (now Eastern Michigan University); his master's degree from the University of Michigan; and his PhD from the Ohio State University ("OSU"). He taught elementary, junior high and high school in rural Michigan, and was an elementary school principal.  He also taught at OSU in Columbus, Ohio and trained numerous future teachers of literature in Leonia, New Jersey before he was hired by Teachers College, Columbia University in 1952, from which he retired with the rank of professor emeritus.During 22 years on the faculty, Dr. Jacobs developed literature as a major part of early education. He encouraged pupils to read literature for their own development. He wrote and edited many books and articles on language arts, reading and teaching pupils.

After retirement, he lectured regularly at colleges and schools of education.  He died from heart failure in 1992 in Englewood, New Jersey.

Works
The Read-It-Yourself Storybook, 
Just Around The Corner,
Is Somewhere Always Far Away?: Poems about Places,
Belling the Cat and Other Stories,
Hello, Year!,
Adventure Lands,
Poetry for Winter,
I Don't, I Do,
Merry-Go-Round, Goodnight Mr. Beetle

References

1907 births
1992 deaths
20th-century American educators
People from Leonia, New Jersey
People from Iosco County, Michigan
Eastern Michigan University alumni
University of Michigan alumni
Ohio State University alumni
Ohio State University faculty
Teachers College, Columbia University faculty